Polisportiva Monterotondo Lupa was an Italian association football club headquartered in Monterotondo, in the Province of Rome, but played their home match inside Rome. In 2013, the club relocated to Maccarese frazione of Fiumicino comune, a suburb of Rome, as a phoenix club of A.S.D. Maccarese Calcio, formerly known as A.S.D. Giada Maccarese Calcio. The club then known as Pol. Maccarese Giada. At the same time, a namesake was also found in 2013 in Monterotondo as A.S.D. Monterotondo Calcio.

History 
The club was founded in 1935 as Polisportiva Monterotondo Calcio. The club participated in Serie D a number of times. In 2010–11 Serie D, the club finished as the runner-up of promotional play-offs. The club speculated itself would be a repêchage candidate to 2011–12 Lega Pro Seconda Divisione.

In mid-2011, the club changed its name to Polisportiva Monterotondo Lupa.

In the season 2011–12 it was relegated to Eccellenza Lazio. In 2012–13 season the club won a promotion back to Serie D.

However, in July 2013, the club was relocated to Maccarese and renamed to Pol. Maccarese Giada.

Colors and badge 
The colors of the team are yellow and blue.

Notable former players

Honours
 Eccellenza Lazio
 (2) Winner (2012–13, 1999–2000)

References

 
Defunct football clubs in Italy
Defunct football clubs in Lazio
Association football clubs established in 1935
1935 establishments in Italy
Association football clubs disestablished in 2013
2013 disestablishments in Italy
Pol Monterotondo Lupa
Sport in the Metropolitan City of Rome Capital